This is a list of the Hong Kong national football team results from 1954 to 1969.

1954

1955
No any matches were played in 1955.

1956

1957
No official matches were played in 1957.

1958

1959

1960
No any official matches were played in 1960.

1961

1962
No any official matches were played in 1962.

1963

1964

1965

1966

1967

1968

1969
No matches were played in 1969.

References

1954
1950s in Hong Kong sport
1960s in Hong Kong sport